Tamás Decsi (born 15 October 1982) is a Hungarian right-handed sabre fencer, 2018 team European champion, 2017 team world champion, three-time Olympian, and 2021 team Olympic bronze medalist. Decsi competed in the 2008 Beijing Olympic Games, the 2016 Rio de Janeiro Olympic Games, and the 2020 Tokyo Olympic Games.

Medal record

Olympic Games

World Championship

European Championship

Grand Prix

World Cup

Awards
Hungarian Junior fencer of the Year: 2002
Member of Hungarian fencing team of the Year: 2007
Hungarian Fencer of the Year: 2009

References

External links

EuroFencing Profile
NBC 2008 Olympics profile

Hungarian male sabre fencers
Living people
Olympic fencers of Hungary
Fencers at the 2008 Summer Olympics
Fencers at the 2016 Summer Olympics
Universiade medalists in fencing
People from Kazincbarcika
1982 births
Universiade bronze medalists for Hungary
Medalists at the 2003 Summer Universiade
Fencers at the 2020 Summer Olympics
Medalists at the 2020 Summer Olympics
Olympic medalists in fencing
Olympic bronze medalists for Hungary
Sportspeople from Borsod-Abaúj-Zemplén County
World Fencing Championships medalists